Chopta Valley is a valley situated in Uttarakhand. It is a popular area for tourism containing alpine vegetation, orchids, rhododendrons and other high-altitude vegetation. The valley is criss-crossed by meandering rivers. The part of the valley in Uttarakhand is the site of the village of Chopta.

References

Mangan district
Valleys of Sikkim